Beat Rhythm News is the debut studio album by English post-punk band Essential Logic, released in December 1979 by record label Rough Trade. It reached number 11 in the UK Indie chart.

Critical reception 

AllMusic called it "a stunning record that remains a benchmark of the punk era".  
  
PopMatters ranked it as 34th in their "The 50 Best Post-Punk Albums Ever" list published in 2017 and republished in 2020.

Track listing
All tracks composed by Lora Logic and arranged by Essential Logic
Side A

 "Quality Crayon Wax OK"		
 "The Order Form" 		
 "Shabby Abbott" 		
 "World Friction" 	

Side B

 "Wake Up" 		
 "Albert" 		
 "Alkaline Loaf in the Area" 		
 "Collecting Dust" 		
 "Popcorn Boy (Waddle Ya Do?)"

Personnel
Essential Logic
Lora Logic - soprano saxophone, tenor saxophone, lead vocals
Ashley Buff (Philip Legg) - guitar, backing vocals
Mark Turner - bass, backing vocals
Dave Flash (Dave Wright) - tenor saxophone, cowbell, backing vocals
Rich Tea (Rich Thompson) - drums

References

External links 

 

1979 debut albums
Albums produced by Hugh Jones (producer)
Rough Trade Records albums
Essential Logic albums